The Centrals cricket team is a former Zimbabwean cricket club based in Kwekwe, Midlands Province. The club was formed for the 2006–07 Zimbabwean cricket season, when Zimbabwe Cricket revamped the first-class domestic teams after the 2005–06 Logan Cup had to be cancelled due to internal strife. The team played for three seasons, until the national cricket board decided to change the domestic format once again prior to the 2009–10 Zimbabwean cricket season, following recommendations from the International Cricket Council.

Key
  denotes that player has appeared in either Test, One Day International or Twenty20 International matches for their country.
 Apps denotes the number of appearances the player has made for Centrals.
 Runs denotes the number of runs scored by the player for Centrals.
 Wkts denotes the number of wickets taken by the player for Centrals.
  denotes the player appeared as a wicket-keeper for Centrals.
 * denotes the player captained Centrals.
 Players are initially listed according to the date of their first-team debut for the club.

Players

References
General
 

Specific

Centrals